Phra Ruang is a legendary figure from Thai history, usually described as the founder of the first Thai kingdom who freed the people from the rule of the ancient Khmer Empire. It is also found as a title that may have referred to one or more kings of Sukhothai, and is referred to in the title of many works of literature, including the Trai Phum Phra Ruang, a Sukhothai-era religious text describing the Buddhist cosmology.

A common version of the Phra Ruang legend is that he was a Thai chieftain of Lavo (Lopburi) with supernatural powers of speech. The Thais had to deliver water to the Khom (Khmer) capital as tax, and Phra Ruang used his powers to make bamboo baskets waterproof so that they could be used to carry the water instead of heavy clay jars. When the Khom king wanted him dead, Phra Ruang escaped and ordained as a monk at Sukhothai. A Khom spy, "diving underground", was sent to find him, but not knowing Phra Ruang's face, inadvertently asked him when they met. Phra Ruang told the spy to stay there, and his powers turned him into stone.

There have been many modern adaptations of the legend. One of the best known is a 1917 play by King Vajiravudh (Rama VI), who explained the supernatural powers as acts of Phra Ruang's great wit.

References

See also 
 Dam Din

Legendary Thai people
Thai folklore